The 2012 Sun Belt Conference football season was the 12th season of college football play for the Sun Belt Conference. The season began August 30, 2012 and concluded January 6, 2013 as part of the 2012-13 NCAA Division I FBS football season. Ten teams participated in the competition: Arkansas State, Florida Atlantic, Florida International, Louisiana–Lafayette, Louisiana–Monroe, Middle Tennessee State, North Texas, South Alabama, Troy and  Western Kentucky.

South Alabama competed in the Sun Belt for the first time and became the conference's tenth team. Due to NCAA transitional rules, South Alabama was not eligible for a conference championship or postseason play.

Preseason

Award watch lists
The following Sun Belt players were named to preseason award watch lists:

Sun Belt Media Day
The Sun Belt media day was held on 16 July, in New Orleans, Louisiana. Florida International received five first place votes and were selected by the coaches as the favorites to win the conference. Arkansas State and Louisiana-Lafayette each received two first place votes, while Western Kentucky received one.

Coaches Poll

Preseason All–Conference Team
The head coaches of the competing teams selected their All–Conference Team. The coaches also selected Ryan Aplin of Arkansas State as the preseason offensive player of the year, and Tourek Williams of Florida International as the preseason defensive player of the year.

Offense

Defense

Specialists

Coaches
NOTE: Stats shown are before the beginning of the season

Sun Belt vs. BCS AQ Conference matchups

Regular season

The Sun Belt has teams in two different time zones. Times reflect start time in respective time zone of each team (all teams central time except for Florida Atlantic and Florida International which are in eastern time). Conference games start times are that of the home team.

Rankings reflect that of the USA Today Coaches poll for that week, until week eight when the BCS poll was used.

Week 1

Players of the week:

Week 2

^ Neutral site

Players of the week:

Week 3

Players of the week:

Week 4

^ULM-Baylor game was most watched Sun Belt game on ESPN in history.

Players of the week:

Week 5

Players of the week:

Week 6

Players of the week:

Week 7

Players of the week:

Week 8

Players of the week:

Week 9

Players of the week:

Week 10

Players of the week:

Week 11

Players of the week:

Week 12

Players of the week:

Week 13

Players of the week:

Week 14

Players of the week:

Bowl games
The Sun Belt placed four teams in bowl games with five teams bowl eligible in 2012. This was the highest number of SBC bowl teams in the conference's history. Only Middle Tennessee was not selected for a bowl. Two Sun Belt teams made their first bowl games in school history: Western Kentucky and Louisiana-Monroe.

NOTE: All times are local

Home attendance

References